East Sepik is a province in Papua New Guinea. Its capital is Wewak. East Sepik has an estimated population of 433,481 people (2010 census) and is 43,426 km square in size.

History
Cherubim Dambui was appointed as East Sepik's first premier by Prime Minister Michael Somare upon the creation of the provincial government in 1976. Dambui remained interim premier until 1979, when he became East Sepik's permanent premier with a full term. He remained in office until 1983.

Geography
Wewak, the provincial capital, is located on the coast of East Sepik. There are a scattering of islands off shore, and coastal ranges dominate the landscape just inland of the coast. The remainder of the province's geography is dominated by the Sepik River, which is one of the largest rivers in the world in terms of water flow and is known for flooding—the river's level can alter by as much as five metres in the course of the year as it rises and falls. The southern areas of the province are taken up by the Hunstein Range and other mountain ranges which form the central cordillera and feed the Sepik River.

Districts and LLGs
Each province in Papua New Guinea has one or more districts, and each district has one or more Local Level Government (LLG) areas. For census purposes, the LLG areas are subdivided into wards and those into census units.

Provincial leaders

The province was governed by a decentralised provincial administration, headed by a Premier, from 1976 to 1995. Following reforms taking effect that year, the national government reassumed some powers, and the role of Premier was replaced by a position of Governor, to be held by the winner of the province-wide seat in the National Parliament of Papua New Guinea.

Premiers (1976–1995)

Governors (1995–present)

Members of the National Parliament

The province and each district is represented by a Member of the National Parliament. There is one provincial electorate and each district is an open electorate.

References

Bibliography
 Hanson, L.W., Allen, B.J., Bourke, R.M. and McCarthy, T.J. (2001). Papua New Guinea Rural Development Handbook. Land Management Group, Research School of Pacific and Asian Studies, The Australian National University, Canberra. Available as a 30 Megabyte PDF.

External Links 

 Anthony Forge Films and Recordings From the Anthony Forge Papers. MSS 411. Special Collections & Archives, UC San Diego

 
Provinces of Papua New Guinea
Momase Region
1976 establishments in Papua New Guinea